is a Japanese actor.

Filmography

Films
 Boku no Hatsukoi o Kimi ni Sasagu (2009)
 Kyōretsu! Mōretsu!! Kodai Shōjo Doguchan Matsuri Special Movie Edition (2010), Makoto Sugihara
 Gachiban Series (2010–2014), Yūto Kuronaga
 13 Assassins (2010), Shōjirō Kokura
 We Can't Change the World. But, We Wanna Build a School in Cambodia. (2011), Masayuki Yano
 Hasami (2012), Yōhei Hayama
 Rurouni Kenshin (2012), Akira Kiyosato
 The Cowards Who Looked to the Sky (2012), Ryōta Fukuda
 Suzuki Sensei (2013), Yoshio Shirai
 Jellyfish Eyes (2013), Yoninshū Seiryū
 Goddotan Kiss Gaman Senshuken The Movie (2013), Michael
 Tobe Dakota (2013), Kenichi Kimura
  The Liar and His Lover (2013), Shinya Shinohara
 Dakishimetai: Shinjitsu no Monogatari (2014), Junpei
 Yamikin Ushijima-kun Part 2 (2014), Rei Kanzaki
 Naniwa Sendō (2014)
 Eiga ST Aka to Shiro no Sōsa File (2015), Yūji Kurosaki
 April Fools (2015), Matsuda
 Prophecy (2015), Yūichi Aoyama
 Romance (2015), Naoki
 64: Part I (2016), Kōichirō Hiyoshi
 64: Part II (2016), Kōichirō Hiyoshi
 Maniac Hero (2016), Makoto Toshida
 Mars (2016)
 Tokyo Ghoul (2017), Ken Kaneki
 The Last Cop (2017), Ryōta Mochizuki
 Thicker Than Water (2018), Kazunari
 Gintama 2 (2018), Bansai Kawakami
 Tokyo Ghoul S (2019), Ken Kaneki
 First Love (2019), Leo
 Diner (2019)
 Fancy (2020)
 Poupelle of Chimney Town (2020), Poupelle (voice)
 The Sunday Runoff (2022), Tanimura
 A Man (2022), Daisuke Taniguchi
 Radiation House: The Movie (2022), Iori Igarashi
 My Broken Mariko (2022), Makio
 Yudō (2023)
 Home Sweet Home (2023), Kenji
 Haru ni Chiru (2023), Toshio Nakanishi

Television
 Chekeraccho!! in Tokyo (Fuji TV, 2006), Takumi Aoba
 Jikuu Keisatsu Wecker Signa (Tokyo MX, 2007), Ēichi Karasuma
 Mop Girl Episode 7 (TV Asahi, 2007), Jun
 K-tai Investigator 7 (TV Tokyo, 2008–2009), Keita Amishima
 Naniwa no Hana: Ogata Kōan Jikenchō (NHK, 2009), Akira Ogata
 Mama wa Mukashi Papa Datta (WOWOW, 2009), Shinichirō Kayama(Miwako)
 The Ancient Dogoo Girl (MBS, 2009), Makoto Sugihara
 Xmas no Kiseki (Tōkai TV, 2009), Ken Hayashida
 Boku ga Celeb to Kekkon Shita Hōhō (NHK 1seg 2, 2010), Shinnosuke Sawada
 GeGeGe no Nyōbō (NHK, 2010), Kēichi Kurata
 Joker: Yurusarezaru Sōsakan Episode 4 (Fuji TV, 2010), Takahiro Shiina
 Koisuru Nihongo (NHK, 2011), Akira
 Misaki Number One!! Episode 3 (NTV, 2011), Nakatsu
 Honboshi: Shinri Tokusō Jikenbo Episode 4 (TV Asahi, 2011), Keita Minobe
 Karyū no Utage (NHK, 2011), Shō Fukuhara
 Aishiteru: Kaiyō (NTV, 2011)
 QP (NTV, 2011), Eiji
 Nazotoki wa Dinner no Atode Episode 4 (Fuji TV, 2011), Miura
 Shiritsu Bakaleya Koukou (NTV, 2012), Hakamatsuka
 Legal High Episode 2 (Fuji TV, 2012), Jango Jango Higashi Kurume
 Taira no Kiyomori (NHK, 2012), Taira no Shigemori
 Sōmatō Kabushikigaisha Episode 1 (TBS, 2012), Takahiro Seki
 Honto ni Atta Kowai Hanashi Natsu no Tokubetsu-hen 2012 (Fuji TV, 2012), Kenta Yamada
 Perfect Blue Episode 1 (TBS, 2012), Takashi Inami
 Ōoku: Tanjō (Arikoto Iemitsu-hen) (TBS, 2012), Sutezō
 Saikō no Rikon (Fuji TV, 2013), Junnosuke Hatsushima
 ST Keishichō Kagaku Sōsahan (NTV, 2013), Yūji Kurosaki
 Summer Nude (Fuji TV, 2013), Hikaru Kirihata
 Limit (TV Tokyo, 2013), Wataru Igarashi
 Sabishii Karyūdo (Fuji TV, 2013), Masato Noro
 Keiji no Manazashi Episodes 10–11 (TBS, 2013), Shingo Yamanouchi
 Urero Mitaiken Shōjo Episode 5 (TV Tokyo, 2014), Shō Saionji
 Kamen Teacher (NTV, 2014), Atsushi Amakawa
 Hanako to Anne (NHK, 2014), Asaichi Kiba
 Asaichi no Yomesan (NHK BS Premium, 2014)
 ST Aka to Shiro no Sōsa File (NTV, 2014), Yūji Kurosaki
 N no Tame ni (TBS, 2014), Shinji Naruse
 Algernon ni Hanataba o (TBS, 2015), Ryūichi Yanagawa
 The Last Cop (NTV, 2015), Ryōta Mochizuki
 Eien no Bokura: Sea Side Blue (NTV, 2015), Kōta Yamauchi
 Death Note (NTV, 2015), Light Yagami
 High&Low: The Story of S.W.O.R.D. (NTV, 2015), Smoky
 Mars (NTV, 2016), Kirishima Makio
 Rinshō Hanzai Gakusha Himura Hideo no Suiri (NTV, 2016), Arisu Arisugawa
 Hitoya no Toge (Wowow, 2017), Ryota
 Fugitive Boys (Fuji TV, 2017), Tobio
 Unnatural (TBS, 2018), Rokuro Kube
 Radiation House (Fuji TV, 2019–2021), Iori Igarashi
 Yell (NHK, 2020), Yūichi Koyama
 Modern Love Tokyo (Amazon Prime Video, 2022), Rin (voice)

Awards

2012
 The 34th Yokohama Film Festival: Best Newcomer for Fugainai Boku wa Sora o Mita and Hasami
 The 27th Takasaki Film Festival: Best Supporting Actor for Fugainai Boku wa Sora o Mita

2014
 The 83rd The Television Drama Academy Awards: Best Supporting Actor for N no Tame ni
 The 24th TV Life Annual Drama Awards: Best Supporting Actor and Best Newcomer for N no Tame ni and Hanako to Anne

2015
 The 86th The Television Drama Academy Awards: Best Actor for Death Note

2021
 The 45th Elan d'or Awards: Newcomer of the Year
 The 14th Tokyo Drama Awards: Best Actor for Yell

2023
 The 77th Mainichi Film Awards: Best Supporting Actor
 The 46th Japan Academy Film Prize: Best Supporting Actor

References

External links
  
 

1988 births
Living people
Male actors from Kanagawa Prefecture
Japanese male television actors
Stardust Promotion artists
21st-century Japanese male actors
Asadora lead actors